Hypotrix diplogramma is a moth of the family Noctuidae first described by Schaus in 1903. It is found in southern North America from eastern Arizona and south-western New Mexico southward at least to Mexico City.

The wingspan is 28–32 mm.

Most records are from ponderosa pine forests.

Adults are on wing from March to late October, probably representing multiple generations.

External links
"A revision of the genus Hypotrix Guenée in North America with descriptions of four new species and a new genus (Lepidoptera, Noctuidae, Noctuinae, Eriopygini)"

Hypotrix
Moths described in 1903